An endangered species is a plant or animal species that is near extinction.

Endangered Species may also refer to:

Films 
 Endangered Species (1982 film), a science fiction film by Alan Rudolph
 Endangered Species (2002 film), a science fiction horror film by Kevin S. Tenney
 Endangered Species, an unrealized film by Eli Roth
 Max Steel: Endangered Species, a 2004 direct-to-DVD film
 Endangered Species (2021 film), an action-adventure film directed by M. J. Bassett

Literature 
 Endangered Species (novel), a 2003 novel based on the American TV series Angel
 "Endangered Species" (The Amazing Spider-Man), an issue of the comic book The Amazing Spider-Man in the storyline "The Gauntlet"
 X-Men: Endangered Species, a 2007 comic book storyline
 Endangered Species, a 1989 short-story collection by Gene Wolfe
 Endangered Species, a 2007 Hardy Boys novel

Music

Albums
 Endangered Species (Big Pun album), 2001
 Endangered Species (Des'ree album), 2000
 Endangered Species (Endangered Species album), 2001
 Endangered Species (eX-Girl album), or the title song, 2004
 Endangered Species (Flaw album), or the title song, 2004
 Endangered Species (H.A.W.K. album), or the title song, 2007
 Endangered Species (Klaatu album), 1980
 Endangered Species (Lynyrd Skynyrd album), 1994
 Endangered Species (Man album), 2000
 Endangered Species (Y&T album), 1997
 Endangered Species, an album by U.K. Subs, 1982
 Endangered Species, an album by Black Sun Empire, 2007

Songs
 "Endangered Species (Tales from the Darkside)", a song by Ice Cube, 1990
 "Endangered Species", a song by Sepultura from Roots, 1996
 "Endangered Species", a song by Wayne Shorter and Joseph Vitarelli from Atlantis, 1985
 "Bop Gun (Endangered Species)", a song by Parliament, 1977

Other uses 
Endangered Species (TV series), Canadian 2014 animated TV series
 Zoo Tycoon 2: Endangered Species, a computer game expansion pack
Endangered species (IUCN status), a conservation status assigned by the IUCN